The STS (Sail Training Ship) Leeuwin II is a tall ship based in Fremantle, Western Australia.

The Leeuwin is a three-masted barquentine. It was built to a design by local naval architect Len Randell by Australian Shipbuilding Industries Pty Ltd (now BAE Systems Australia) and launched on 2 August 1986. It is currently operated by Leeuwin Ocean Adventure Foundation, a private not-for-profit organisation that runs youth training voyages along the West Australian coast.

The hull is welded steel with a teak deck. A full crew consists of 55 people, consisting of 5 permanent crew, up to 10 volunteers (including four watch leaders, a bosun's mate, cook's mate and purser), and 40 participants. The watch leaders take control of the four watch groups and lead the trainees through activities and ship duties on voyages of three days and more.

References

External links

 Sail Leeuwin The Leeuwin Ocean Adventure Foundation homepage

Individual sailing vessels
Fremantle
Three-masted ships
Barquentines
Tall ships of Australia
1986 ships
Sail training ships